For a list of eminent Argentine rugby union players, irrespective of whether they have played for the Argentina national rugby union team please see List of Argentine rugby union players.

List of Argentina national rugby union players is a list of people who have played for the Argentina national rugby union team. The list only includes players who have played in a Test match.

Note that the "position" column lists the position at which the player made his Test debut, not necessarily the position for which he is best known. A position in parentheses indicates that the player debuted as a substitute.

Sources
The main original source for the information in this list is Scrum.com's database listing of Country caps for Argentina. Although largely comprehensive, there have been known inconsistencies noted when relying entirely on this database. Where these have been found for this specific list, it is noted. Additionally, where other historic sources conflict with this database, or where they provide additional detail, this has also been noted.

The first test

#The first fifteen players listed above represent those taken from scrum.com (as described in Source above). A separate source, from an article by Paul Dobson entitled Argentina and the 'Lions' in the past agrees with the listing (with the exception of some spelling, Bovet for Bover, Hayman for Hyman, and Watson for Watson-Hutton). This itself is sourced from Eduardo Maschwitz's 100 Anos de la Union Argentina de Rugby. However, Dobson cites an earlier book, Los Pumas, that gives a different team, replacing Hayman, Heriot, Mold and Henrys with O Throp (Buenos Aires), WF Bridger (Rosario), D Mackay (Buenos Aires), FLH Maitland (Belgrano) and J Monks (Lomas). Another contemporary source adds to the confusion, because in 1910, Dulwich College, in its school magazine The Alleynian published news of former pupils that had played for "the Argentine v. the English Rugby Union Team". On page 396 it named W. H. Bridger, K. G. Drysdale, and C. T. Mold as having played. This is of note because it corroborates Mold's inclusion, as per scrum.com's listing, but also Bridger's inclusion as per Los Pumas, which itself excludes Mold. On the 1910 British Lions tour to Argentina there was a test against Argentina, but also a match against the Argentinos made up of Argentine born players. This may be where the differences lie, although only a contemporary team sheet will illuminate this.

From 1927

References

Further reading
Eduardo Maschwitz, 100 Anos de la Union Argentina de Rugby, Mar 1999, (Publisher: Manrique Zago Ediciones), 

 
Rugby union
Argentine